Sydney Earnest Christian,  (17 April 1868 – 17 May 1931) was an Australian Army colonel and temporary brigadier general in the First World War. He retired in 1918 with the rank of honorary brigadier general.

See also
List of Australian generals

References
Sydney Christian, Biography at General Officers of the First AIF, www.aif.adfa.edu.au
Whitelaw, J.  (1979) 'Christian, Sydney Ernest (1868–1931)', Australian Dictionary of Biography, Volume 7, (MUP)

1868 births
1931 deaths
Australian generals
Australian military personnel of World War I
Companions of the Order of St Michael and St George
Officiers of the Légion d'honneur
People educated at Geelong Grammar School
People educated at The King's School, Parramatta
People from Sydney
Military personnel from New South Wales